Benzoates (salts of benzoic acid) can refer to:
Ammonium benzoate
Calcium benzoate
Magnesium benzoate
Potassium benzoate
 Sodium benzoate